Filatima spinigera is a moth of the family Gelechiidae. It is found in North America, where it has been recorded from California.

The wingspan is 20–22 mm. The forewings are sordid white to cinereous variously irrorated and marked with fuscous and overlaid with fuscous on the costa, to apical third rather strongly, but narrowly. A poorly defined white spot is found at the apical third and is preceded by a small, fuscous blotch. There is a row of indistinct, small fuscous spots around the apex and along the termen, terminated, slightly before the tornus, by an ill-defined, fuscous, outwardly oblique dash confluent with the discal spot at the end of the cell. A small fuscous spot is found in the center of the cell and both discal cell spots are preceded and followed by light yellowish brown scales. The hindwings are shining silvery white.

References

Moths described in 1947
Filatima